.mo can also refer to the file extension of binary files that have been compiled from .po files using GNU gettext.

.mo is the Internet country code top-level domain (ccTLD) for Macau, China.

The registry for this domain name is operated by the Macao Network Information Centre (MONIC). Operated by the University of Macau since 1992, MONIC administers the registration of the country-code domain names ccTLD.

To further promote the development of services, the Government of Macau changed the operation entity of MONIC. Effective from 12 March 2011, HNET Asia Limited  appointed by the Macau government, is responsible for operating MONIC.

HNET aims at optimising and developing the Macau domain name.  It will be contributing to the development of the internet industry in Macau, as well as deploying Chinese domain names (including at the Top-Level, .澳門), DNSSEC and other capabilities for the registry.

At present, domain names are open to local businesses and organisations and cannot be registered by the general public.

Domain name registration 
Second-level Domain name registrations:
.mo, .澳門 - commercial entities in Macau

Third-level Domain name registrations:
.com.mo, .公司.mo, .公司.澳門 - commercial entities
.edu.mo, .教育.mo, .教育.澳門 - educational institutions
.gov.mo, .政府.mo, .政府.澳門 - government departments
.net.mo, .網絡.mo, .網絡.澳門 - network service providers
.org.mo, .組織.mo, .組織.澳門 - non-profit organizations

Internationalised top level domain 
In early 2015 two new top level domains were reserved for Macau. They are .澳门 (in simplified Chinese) and .澳門 (in traditional Chinese). MONIC has requested these domains.

See also 
 .hk (Hong Kong)
 .cn (Mainland China)

References

External links 
 IANA .mo whois information

Country code top-level domains
Communications in Macau

sv:Toppdomän#M